The Department of Environment, Parks, Heritage and the Arts (DEPHA) was a government department of the Australian state of Tasmania, that included many of the agencies that manage Tasmania's natural and cultural heritage.  As at 1 July 2010 it was amalgamated with the Department of Primary Industries and Water to form the Department of Primary Industries, Parks, Water and Environment (DPIPWE).

DEPHA incorporated or had close ties to the following government businesses:

Arts Tasmania
Tasmanian Museum and Art Gallery
Tasmanian Parks and Wildlife Service
Aboriginal Heritage Tasmania
Heritage Tasmania
Royal Tasmanian Botanical Gardens
Environment
Port Arthur Historic Site Management Authority
Wellington Park Management Trust

In February 2008, Tourism Tasmania and Events Tasmania moved to the Department of Economic Development and Tourism.  On 1 July 2010 Arts Tasmania and the Tasmanian Museum and Art Gallery also moved to the Department of Economic Development, Tourism and the Arts.

DEPHA also provided support to:
 Environment Protection Authority
 www.depha.tas.gov.au
 www.environment.tas.gov.au 

Environment